Orion (HSK-1) was an auxiliary cruiser of Nazi Germany's Kriegsmarine which operated as a merchant raider in World War II. Blohm & Voss built her in Hamburg in 1930–31 as the cargo ship Kurmark. The navy requisitioned her at the start of World War II, had her converted into the auxiliary cruiser Orion, and commissioned her on 9 December 1939. Known to the Kriegsmarine as Schiff 36, her Royal Navy designation was Raider A. She was named after the constellation Orion.

Construction and conversion
Blohm & Voss in Hamburg built the ship as a freighter for the Hamburg America Line (HAPAG). To save money, steam turbines from the liner New York were re-used. That proved a poor decision, since the Orion was plagued for her entire life by engine problems.

After the war began the German Seekriegsleitung (Naval Operations Command) was ill-prepared for raider warfare. The operations of the German auxiliary cruisers of World War I were evaluated and considered a great success, having disrupted British merchant shipping around the world. However the overall effect on the war was evaluated as having been rather minor and so only a small program of converting merchant ships into auxiliary cruisers was initiated on 5 September 1939.

The first two ships being requisitioned were the Kurmark (Orion) and the Neumark, and conversion started immediately.

Raider voyage
One of Germany's first auxiliary cruisers in World War II, Orion left Germany on 6 April 1940,
under the command of Korvettenkapitän (later Fregattenkapitän) Kurt Weyher. Disguised as a neutral ship she passed south through the Atlantic Ocean, where she attacked and sank , a  freighter.

In May 1940 Orion rounded Cape Horn and entered the Pacific Ocean. She entered New Zealand waters in June 1940 and laid mines off Auckland during the night of 13–14 June 1940, one of which sank the ocean liner  five days later. Two other ships struck mines from Orion, as did two trawlers and an auxiliary minesweeper.

Orion then raided across the Indian and Pacific Oceans attacking four more ships. One ship, the Norwegian freighter Tropic Sea, was captured without a fight and sent to occupied France as a prize, though she was scuttled in the Bay of Biscay after encountering . The other ships encountered by Orion were sunk.

Operating together, they sank another seven ships, including the liner  and five ships off Nauru, before going their separate ways in the new year.

The German naval attaché to Japan, Vice-Admiral Paul Wenneker, bought a Nakajima E8N float plane early in 1941. It was dispatched on board the supply ship Münsterland to rendezvous with Orion at the Maug Islands in the Northern Marianas. They met on 1 February 1941, and Orion thus became the only German naval ship of World War II to use a Japanese float plane.

Another six months cruising in the Indian Ocean yielded nothing, though she did encounter and capture her final victim, in July 1941, in the South Atlantic when Orion was on her way home.

Orion returned to Bordeaux in occupied France on 23 August 1941.

The German freighter Anneliese Essberger, disguised as the Norwegian freighter Herstein, was meant to meet the Orion on 30 Aug. 1941. The planned rendezvous was Point Corona at 28 degrees N, 43 degrees W. But the freighter failed to see the Orion, and continued north.

Later history
De-commissioned as a commerce raider, the ship was renamed Hektor in 1944 and was used as artillery training ship. In January 1945 she was again renamed Orion and was used to take refugees from Germany's eastern provinces across the Baltic Sea to ports in northern Germany and occupied Denmark. On her way to Copenhagen on 4 May 1945, after she had picked up the crew of the old battleship , Orion was hit by two bombs dropped by aircraft of the Soviet 51st Mine-Torpedo Aviation Regiment off Swinemünde. The crew managed to beach the fiercely burning ship on a sandbank, but more than 150 passengers and crew were killed. The hulk was scrapped in 1952.

Raiding history

Sunk by Orion
1940-04-24 Haxby 
1940-06-19 Tropic Sea 
1940-08-16 Notou 
1940-08-20 Turakina 
1940-10-14 Ringwood 
1941-07-29 Chaucer

Sunk by mines laid by Orion
1940-06-19  
 1941-05-14  

(The claims by several sources that the freighters Port Bowen and Baltannic were also victims of the Orion's mines, seem, on examination of the records now available, to be unsubstantiated)

In concert with Komet
1940-11-25 Holmwood 
1940-11-27  
1940-12-06 Triona 
1940-12-08 Triadic 
1940-12-08 Triaster

Notes

References

External links
 

1930 ships
Auxiliary cruisers of the Kriegsmarine
Cruisers sunk by aircraft
Maritime incidents in May 1945
Ships built in Hamburg
Ships of the Hamburg America Line
Ships sunk by Soviet aircraft
Steamships of Germany
World War II commerce raiders
World War II cruisers of Germany
World War II shipwrecks in the Baltic Sea